Donald Walker (died September 28, 2009) was a United States politician who served from 1994 to 2009 as mayor of Warner Robins, Georgia. He was in the midst of a campaign for a fourth term in office when he committed suicide by a self-inflicted gunshot wound. He had previously temporarily stepped down as mayor during foot surgery in 2008, during which Clifford Holmes served as mayor pro tem; after Walker's death, John Havrilla served as mayor pro tem until a successor, Chuck Shaheen, was elected in the November 2009 election.

Walker hailed from the Walker family, a political family that has participated in the politics of central Georgia throughout the second half of the 20th century.

References

2009 deaths
Mayors of Warner Robins, Georgia
1949 births
20th-century American politicians
2009 suicides
Suicides by firearm in Georgia (U.S. state)